BaCo Liner an abbreviation for 'Ba'rge - 'Co'ntainer - Carrier, was a shipping service between Europe and Africa owned by Seerederei Bacoliner GmbH of Duisburg, Germany. It used a fleet of specialized barge carrying LASH vessels which have a very unusual design: they carry both conventional shipping containers, and barges that are loaded through twin doors in the bow, a kind of 'float in-float out' arrangement.

This system of barges inside a larger ship allowed cargo to be discharged while at anchor mid-stream in African ports, avoiding port delays.  The barges could be loaded up to 800 tonnes each, 12 could be loaded per ship. Container capacity was 500-650 TEU.

Each vessel was approx. 205 m long, 28.5 m beam, operating on a loaded draught of 6.65 m. Gross tonnage 22345 tonnes, deadweight 21800 tonnes including 12 barges with 800 tonnes each.  Service speed was 15 knots.

In 2007, 24 Filipino crew of a Baco Liner vessel were kidnapped by pirates in Chanomi Creek, Nigeria.

Fleet and fate 
The fleet comprised the three barge carriers: BACO-LINER 1, BACO-LINER 2 and BACO-LINER 3, all completed between 1979 and 1984 by Thyssen Nordseewerke GmbH at Emden.  They sailed under the Liberian flag, serving ports between Nouadhibou, Mauritania, and Port Harcourt, Nigeria.

BACO-LINER 3 was scrapped in Alang Beach, India, in July 2012.  BACO-LINER 2 followed there in June 2013 and BACO-LINER 1 in August 2013. Vessel tracking services now list all three Baco-liners as scrapped.

References

External links 
Ship list at vesseltracker.com
Gallery

Cargo liners
Shipping companies of Germany